Wing and a Prayer, The Story of Carrier X (also known as Queen of the Flat Tops  and  Torpedo Squadron Eight) is a black-and-white 1944 war film about the heroic crew of an American aircraft carrier in the desperate early days of World War II in the Pacific theater, directed by Henry Hathaway and starring Don Ameche, Dana Andrews and William Eythe. Although arguably a classic propaganda movie,  it was appreciated for its realistic portrayal and was nominated for the 1944 Academy Award for Best Original Screenplay.

The film title Wing and a Prayer was borrowed from a number one hit song in 1943, "Comin' In on a Wing and a Prayer". In a bit of studio self-promotion, the carrier crew watches another 20th Century Fox picture, Tin Pan Alley (1940), during the film.

Plot
In the days just after the attack on Pearl Harbor, the American people are asking "Where is our navy? Why doesn't it fight?" Gravely weakened by the disaster, the US Navy comes up with a plan to trap the Japanese by using one carrier to imitate a fleet in order to deceive the Japanese Navy into heading for Midway, where they will be attacked. Meanwhile, on the carrier charged with the mission ("Carrier X"), flight commander Bingo Harper is in charge of the bomber crews that shouldered the burden in the desperate early days of the war. He is tough and sticks to the rules, while his young pilots behave more like youngsters and do not always understand his thinking.

A new squadron led by Lieutenant Commander Edward Moulton is assigned to the carrier. From the first landing, Harper notices a careless and inexperienced attitude by ex-Hollywood Academy Award–winning star, Ensign Hallam "Oscar" Scott. Harper warns Moulton that the squadron's safety cannot be jeopardized and any repeat of the sloppiness will not be tolerated. Moulton does his best with his men, but is far from having absolute control. During a bombing run, Ensign Breinard drops a bomb close to the carrier and Harper grounds him. After winning the Navy Cross for actions at Coral Sea, Ensign Cunningham fails to follow the correct takeoff procedure and ditches his aircraft into the sea: Harper forbids him to fly again. Later, Cunningham saves the ship in a suicide attack on a torpedo from a Japanese aircraft.

In the meantime, a message is received from Navy headquarters. The carrier is ordered to travel deep into enemy waters, near the Solomon Islands, and make its presence known in order to deceive the Japanese about American fleet dispositions and intentions. However, they are under strict orders not to fight. When Moulton's bombers encounter some Japanese aircraft, they follow orders and retreat, but two aircraft are lost. Not knowing the plan, the pilots are furious. This is repeated several times in other widely-separated locations, driving the aviators to the brink of rebellion. The carrier, however, accomplishes its mission as the Japanese believe that the sightings are of different American carriers, not just one.

Finally, the long-prepared trap is sprung. Deceived into believing that the American carriers are scattered across the Pacific, the Japanese are taken by surprise when the concentrated American fleet attacks their carriers. Many pilots are lost, but the Americans win a great victory. However, the last bomber, flown by Scott and very low on fuel, has trouble finding their carrier, which is concealed below low clouds. Moulton begs Harper to turn on the searchlights to guide him in, but Harper refuses to risk betraying the carrier's location to any Japanese submarines that may be lurking nearby. Eventually, Scott's aircraft is heard crashing into the water when it runs out of fuel. Moulton and Harper quarrel, but in a few minutes, it is reported that Scott has been picked up by a destroyer. Harper gives his men an explanation of his reasoning when giving orders which may mean sacrificing a few for the success of the mission.

Cast

 Don Ameche as Commander Bingo Harper
 Dana Andrews as Lieutenant Commander Edward Moulton
 William Eythe as Ensign Hallam "Oscar" Scott
 Charles Bickford as Captain Waddell
 Cedric Hardwicke as the Admiral
 Kevin O'Shea as Ensign Charles "Cookie" Cunningham
 Richard Jaeckel as Beezy Bessemer
 Harry Morgan (credited as Henry Morgan) as Ensign Malcolm Brainard
 Richard Crane as Ensign Gus Chisholm
 Glenn Langan as the Executive Officer
 Renny McEvoy as Ensign Cliff Hale
 Robert Bailey as Ensign Paducah Holloway
 Reed Hadley as Commander O'Donnell
 John Kellogg as a Duty Officer 
 George Mathews as Dooley
 B.S. Pully as Flat Top
 John C. Young as Jeep driver
 Ray Walker as Sailor assisting projectionist

Historical accuracy
Wing and a Prayer ... loosely portrays actual historic events related mainly with the Battle of the Coral Sea and the Battle of Midway. The scenario is, however, intentionally changed to justify the initial defensive rather than offensive posture of a US Navy reeling from the early Japanese victories in 1942. The Battle of the Coral Sea is justified as a calculated plot to deceive the Japanese into believing that the U.S. fleet was scattered and vulnerable, while the Battle of Midway is depicted as the eventual springing of this carefully laid trap which thereby caught the enemy at a disadvantage.

Production
Wing and a Prayer was based on Stanley Johnston’s Queen of the Flat Tops (1942), a book that 20th Century Fox tried to buy but the rights were not obtained. After a legal tangle, the studio dropped its plans to buy rights but Johnson sued and won a settlement in 1946.

Although some scenes were shot in studio back lots, and water tank, the carrier is the USS Yorktown, a typical Essex class, with filming by 20th Century Fox permitted by the US Navy during her shakedown cruise in 1943. The US Navy exacted control over the Wing and a Prayer to the extent that the film was a "semi-official" production.

The aircraft used in the Wing and a Prayer, The Story of Carrier X were mainly Grumman TBF Avenger torpedo bombers, Grumman F6F Hellcat fighters and Curtiss SB2C Helldiver dive bombers.  These were contemporary with US Navy carrier aircraft designs during 1943 and 1944 rather than 1942 when the film is set. In a few scenes, Grumman F4F Wildcat fighters and Douglas SBD Dauntless dive bombers appear which would have been accurate for 1942.

Grumman F4F Wildcat fighters play the part of Japanese "Zero" fighters in the film.  A Curtiss-Wright CW-22 also makes a very brief appearance as a Japanese reconnaissance aircraft.   The action on the carrier deck is convincing as well as the character of the pilots. Real footage is mixed with action shot on the carrier. For some scenes, scale models were also utilized.

Reception
Film critic Thomas M. Pryor reviewed Wing and a Prayer, The Story of Carrier X for The New York Times. He commented: "at once a sobering reminder of the perilous conditions under which the American Navy sailed the vast Pacific in the months immediately following Pearl Harbor and a first-rate piece of movie-making to boot."

During his 1980 campaign, former actor and presidential candidate Ronald Reagan often told a story about a heroic pilot to whom he personally awarded a medal. However, he was actually recalling the story line from Wing and a Prayer. But, he strongly believed that he was involved in the medal process to this war hero.

References

Notes

Citations

Bibliography

 Beck, Simon D. The Aircraft-Spotter's Film and Television Companion. Jefferson, North Carolina: McFarland and Company, 2016. .
 Orriss, Bruce. When Hollywood Ruled the Skies: The Aviation Film Classics of World War II. Hawthorne, California: Aero Associates Inc., 1984. .
 Paris, Michael. From the Wright Brothers to Top Gun: Aviation, Nationalism, and Popular Cinema. Manchester, UK: Manchester University Press, 1995. .
 Pendo, Stephen. Aviation in the Cinema. Lanham, Maryland: Scarecrow Press, 1985. .
 Solomon, Aubrey. Twentieth Century-Fox: A Corporate and Financial History. Lanham, Maryland: Rowman & Littlefield, 2002. .

External links
 
 
 
 

1944 films
1940s English-language films
American aviation films
American black-and-white films
Films directed by Henry Hathaway
Films scored by Hugo Friedhofer
Pacific War films
Films about the United States Navy in World War II
World War II aviation films
World War II films made in wartime
20th Century Fox films
American war drama films
1940s war drama films
1944 drama films